Tauno Mikko Lappalainen (10 March 1898 – 25 January 1973) was a Finnish cross-country skier who competed in the late 1920s and early 1930s.

He was born and died in Liperi.

Lappalainen won three medals at the FIS Nordic World Ski Championships with two silvers in 1926 (30 km, 50 km) and one bronze in 1930 (17 km).

At the 1928 Winter Olympics he finished sixth in the 50 km event. Four years later he finished seventh in the 50 km event at the 1932 Winter Olympics.

Cross-country skiing results
All results are sourced from the International Ski Federation (FIS).

Olympic Games

World Championships
 3 medals – (2 silver, 1 bronze)

References

External links

1898 births
1973 deaths
People from Liperi
People from Kuopio Province (Grand Duchy of Finland)
Finnish male cross-country skiers
Olympic cross-country skiers of Finland
Cross-country skiers at the 1928 Winter Olympics
Cross-country skiers at the 1932 Winter Olympics
FIS Nordic World Ski Championships medalists in cross-country skiing
Sportspeople from North Karelia